Cox City is an unincorporated community in Grady County, Oklahoma, United States. A post office operated in Cox City from 1927 to 1964. The town was named after an oil man, Edwin B. Cox, from Ardmore.

References

Unincorporated communities in Grady County, Oklahoma
Unincorporated communities in Oklahoma